S.O.S. Tidal Wave is a 1939 American crime film directed by John H. Auer and written by Gordon Kahn and Maxwell Shane. The film stars Ralph Byrd, George Barbier, Kay Sutton, Frank Jenks, Marc Lawrence and Dorothy Lee. It was released on June 2, 1939 by Republic Pictures.

Plot
Reporter Jeff Shannon stops trying to expose political corruption after his son and wife are threatened. On election day, corrupt politicians broadcast the 1933 apocalyptic science-fiction film Deluge on the news, hoping to trick voters into believing that New York City has been hit by a tidal wave to discourage them from voting.

Cast
Ralph Byrd as Jeff Shannon
George Barbier as Uncle Dan Carter
Kay Sutton as Laurel Shannon
Frank Jenks as Peaches Jackson
Marc Lawrence as Melvin Sutter
Dorothy Lee as Mable
Oscar O'Shea as Mike Halloran
Mickey Kuhn as Buddy Shannon
Ferris Taylor as Clifford Farrow
Don "Red" Barry as Curley Parsons
Raymond Bailey as Roy Nixon

Production
Republic Pictures acquired the rights to the 1933 disaster film Deluge, which begins with a special-effects sequence of Manhattan being destroyed by a tsunami.

References

External links
 

1939 films
1930s English-language films
American crime films
1939 crime films
Republic Pictures films
Films directed by John H. Auer
American black-and-white films
1930s American films